Meningeal artery may refer to

 Anterior meningeal branch of anterior ethmoidal artery
 Meningeal branches of vertebral artery
 Middle meningeal artery
 Posterior meningeal artery